Erwin "Ernie" Woerner (May 26, 1905 – December 26, 1972) was an American football player. He played college football for Bucknell and in the National Football League (NFL) as a tackle for the Newark Tornadoes (1930). He appeared in eight NFL games, four as a starter.

References

1906 births
1972 deaths
Bucknell Bison football players
Newark Tornadoes players
Players of American football from Newark, New Jersey
American football tackles